Jean Schintgen (born 23 March 1939) is a Luxembourgian wrestler. He competed in the men's Greco-Roman featherweight at the 1960 Summer Olympics.

References

1939 births
Living people
Luxembourgian male sport wrestlers
Olympic wrestlers of Luxembourg
Wrestlers at the 1960 Summer Olympics
Sportspeople from Charleroi